"Una lacrima sul viso" (Italian for A Tear on your Face) is a song composed by Lunero and Mogol and performed by Bobby Solo. The song premiered at the fourteenth Sanremo Music Festival, with a double performance by Solo and Frankie Laine, who proposed an English version of the song with the title "For Your Love". The song entered the final, but Solo was affected by laryngitis. Unable to sing live, he sang with playback, being subsequently disqualified.

The single peaked at first place for nine consecutive weeks on the Italian hit parade. It sold over three million copies worldwide, and it was awarded a gold disc.

Track listing
 7" single – SRL 10-338   
 "Una lacrima sul viso" (Lunero, Mogol)
 "Non ne posso più"  (Giorgio Salvioni, Iller Pattacini)

Covers
Besides the famous cover by Frankie Laine (single) as "For Your Love" (CBS, 1332), compilation Papaveri & papere (Poppies & ducks) 1995 (Drive, CD/DRIVE 600), the song was covered by several artists, including notably Achille Togliani, Claude Challe, and musical scores by Richard Clayderman, Franck Pourcel and Francis Goya.

In popular culture
The song also named a musicarello film with the same name (in Italian Una lacrima sul viso, English title Tears on Your Face), a film directed by Ettore Maria Fizzarotti and starring Bobby Solo and Laura Efrikian.

The song was also used in several films, notably Whit Stillman's Barcelona, Xavier Giannoli's When I Was a Singer, and François Ozon's 5x2.

References

1964 singles
Italian songs
Number-one singles in Italy
1964 songs
Sanremo Music Festival songs
Songs written by Mogol (lyricist)
Bobby Solo songs
Songs written by Bobby Solo